"We Close Our Eyes" is a song by British pop band Go West, composed by both members Peter Cox and Richard Drummie. Recognizable by its synthesizer hook, it was the first single from their début album Go West.

The single was promoted by a music video directed by Godley & Creme. This video included Cox, Drummie and the guitarist Alan Murphy, performing the song in front of dancing wooden artist mannequins.

In April 1985, the single was discussed by Molly Meldrum and Queen singer Freddie Mercury on the Australian music show Countdown. Mercury was impressed and predicted the band would be "very, very big".

The "Total Overhang Club Mix" was later included on the 1985 compilation Bangs & Crashes. A further remix of the song appeared on Aces and Kings – The Best of Go West in 1993.

A remix of the song was released in 1993 to promote the Aces and Kings retrospective.

The song is featured on the 1985 Italian horror film Demons.

Chart performance
"We Close Our Eyes" spent fourteen weeks on the UK Singles Chart, peaking at number 5 in April 1985. In the United States, the single reached 41 on the Billboard Hot 100 and number 5 on the Hot Dance Music/Club Play chart.

Weekly charts

Year-end charts

References

Go West (band) songs
1985 debut singles
1985 songs
Music videos directed by Godley and Creme
Chrysalis Records singles
Songs written by Peter Cox (musician)
Songs written by Richard Drummie